Fàn Yun (451–15 June 503) was born in Wuyin (舞阴) (in the northwest of today's Biyang County (泌阳县), Zhumadian Prefect, Henan Province) and lived during the Liu Song, Southern Qi  and Liang dynasties. He learned to write poems at the age of eight and had a quick wit. He was a personal friend of Emperor Wu, founder of the Liang dynasty, and held authority as Wu's de facto chancellor, although he died less than two years into Emperor Wu's reign. Fàn was a member of the elite Fàn family.

Life

See also
Yongming poetry

References

451 births
503 deaths
Liang dynasty poets
Southern Qi politicians
Liang dynasty politicians
5th-century Chinese poets
Southern Qi poets